GX7 may refer to:

 Geely GX7, a 2012–2016 Chinese compact SUV
 Panasonic Lumix DMC-GX7, a  compact mirrorless interchangeable lens camera